The 1970–71 Indiana Hoosiers men's basketball team represented Indiana University. Their head coach was Lou Watson, who after taking a one-year leave of absence to recover from surgery returned for his 5th and final year. Jerry Oliver, who filled in for Watson the previous season, again filled in for him when Watson resigned before the last game of the season. For the last time, the team played its home games in New Fieldhouse in Bloomington, Indiana, and was a member of the Big Ten Conference.

The Hoosiers finished the regular season with an overall record of 17–7 and a conference record of 9–5, finishing 4th in the Big Ten Conference. Indiana was not invited to play in any postseason tournament.

Roster

Schedule/Results

|-
!colspan=8| Regular Season
|-

References

Indiana Hoosiers
Indiana Hoosiers men's basketball seasons
Indiana Hoosiers
Indiana Hoosiers